Paul Walker (born 20 August 1977 in Kilwinning, North Ayrshire, Scotland) is a Scottish footballer who played as a winger.

Having been developed as a player through Dundee United 's youth system, Walker made six league appearances for the United first team, his last coming in September 1997. In December 1998, he joined St Mirren but would make just one substitute league appearance before joining Stranraer three months later. His stay at Stair Park lasted two-and-a-half years, where he managed 14 goals from 61 league appearances; his stay included a short loan spell with Queens Park. In 2001, he headed to Partick Thistle, where he spent two seasons, before a similar time with Greenock Morton. A year back at Stranraer followed, before a short-lived spell at Montrose. Walker signed for Ayr United in August 2006 before joining East Fife at the start of the 2007–08 season. After playing just once in the 2008–09 season, Walker moved to Junior level with Irvine Meadow.

Honours
Queen's Park
Scottish Third Division: 1999–2000

Partick Thistle
Scottish First Division: 2001–02

References

External links

Profile at Arab Archive

1977 births
People from Kilwinning
Living people
Scottish footballers
Association football wingers
Dundee United F.C. players
St Mirren F.C. players
Stranraer F.C. players
Queen's Park F.C. players
Partick Thistle F.C. players
Greenock Morton F.C. players
Montrose F.C. players
Ayr United F.C. players
East Fife F.C. players
Scottish Football League players
Scottish Premier League players
Scottish Junior Football Association players
Irvine Meadow XI F.C. players
Footballers from North Ayrshire